California v. Ciraolo, 476 U.S. 207 (1986), was a decision by the Supreme Court of the United States in which the Court held that aerial observation of a person's backyard by police, even if done without a search warrant, does not violate the Fourth Amendment to the U.S. Constitution.

In the case, police in Santa Clara, California flew a private airplane over the property of Dante Ciraolo and took aerial photographs of his backyard after receiving an anonymous tip that he was growing marijuana plants.

Background
Dante Carlo Ciraolo grew marijuana plants in his backyard, shielded from view by two fences. After receiving an anonymous tip, the Santa Clara police sent officers in a private airplane to fly over and take aerial photographs of his property at an altitude of 1,000 feet. Based on an officer's naked eye observation, a search warrant was granted. After the trial court rejected Ciraolo's motion to suppress the evidence (under the exclusionary rule), he pleaded guilty. The California Court of Appeal reversed the decision, holding that the aerial observation was an intrusion into the curtilage of his home and therefore the Fourth Amendment.

Opinion of the Court
Chief Justice Warren Burger wrote for the 5-4 majority, referring to Katz v. United States. He concluded, "The Fourth Amendment simply does not require the police traveling in the public airways at this altitude to obtain a warrant in order to observe what is visible to the naked eye."

Dissenting opinion
Justice Powell wrote a dissenting opinion, in which Justices Brennan, Marshall, and Blackmun joined. Also citing Katz, Powell argued that the decision ignored that case's two-part test.

In arguing that Ciraolo did have a reasonable expectation of privacy, Powell notes:

See also
 List of United States Supreme Court cases, volume 476
 List of United States Supreme Court cases
 Lists of United States Supreme Court cases by volume
 List of United States Supreme Court cases by the Rehnquist Court
 California v. Greenwood, 
 Curtilage
 Dow Chemical Co. v. United States, 
 Florida v. Riley, 
 Kyllo v. United States, 
 Open-fields doctrine

References

 References

 Sources
 California v. Ciraolo, 476 U.S. 207 (1986)

External links
 
 

United States Fourth Amendment case law
United States Supreme Court cases
United States Supreme Court cases of the Burger Court
1986 in United States case law
1986 in California
Legal history of California